Joseph Neil Jackson (born 6 March 1946) is a British former international swimmer.

Swimming career
He competed in three events at the 1968 Summer Olympics. He represented England and won a silver medal in the 440 yards medley and a bronze medal in the 220 yards backstroke, at the 1966 British Empire and Commonwealth Games in Kingston, Jamaica.

References

1946 births
Living people
British male swimmers
Olympic swimmers of Great Britain
Swimmers at the 1968 Summer Olympics
Sportspeople from Southport
Commonwealth Games medallists in swimming
Commonwealth Games silver medallists for England
Commonwealth Games bronze medallists for England
Swimmers at the 1966 British Empire and Commonwealth Games
Medallists at the 1966 British Empire and Commonwealth Games